Alexios Schandermani (born October 25, 1953) is an Iranian German writer.   



Early life
Schandermani lived in Tehran, the capital of Iran. In 1953 US Central Intelligence Agency overthrew the Iranian government of Prime Minister Mohammed Mossadegh and restored Shah Mohammed Reza Pahlavi. Schandermani's father was a leftist politician. After CIA coup his father was arrested and sentenced to death. But he escaped from the detention centre and later on moved to the USSR where the Soviet officials granted him political asylum. In the early 60's Schandermani immigrated with his mother to Russia, where family was reunited. In 1961 he went to school in Moscow. Two years later he continued his school education in a special school for foreigners Interdom located in the Russian city Ivanovo. In 1971 he graduated from this school and moved to Dushanbe capitol of the former Soviet Republic of Tajikistan. In 1979 after the fall of the Shah's regime Schandermani went via West-Berlin back to Iran. After his arrival at the Tehran's airport Mehrabad he was arrested and jailed. Four days later he was expelled from the country to the German city Berlin, where he applied for political asylum. In 1992 he was naturalized and became citizen of the Federal Republic of Germany.

Career
In 1978 Schandermani received a Master of Arts Degree in Pedagogical Science from the Tajik State Pedagogical University  in  Dushanbe, Tajikistan, part of the former USSR. From 1983 to 1990 he studied Slavic Studies at Free University of Berlin.

In 1995 Schandermani was on mission in the conflict zone of Chechnya, where he started to work as a relief delegate for the International Committee of the Red Cross. He helped to coordinate the humanitarian assistance arriving in Chechnya and monitored the distribution. He had different lines of responsibilities in the Northern Caucasus. In Nalchik he worked as a warehouse manager. In Grozny he worked as water sanitation fleet manager. He coordinated all fleet movements in support of water distribution network. He provided medical supplies to hospitals in the Chechen controlled areas. He evacuated the wounded from South of Chechnya to the hospitals in Grozny. He established line of contact with the rebel commanders and with the Chechen general Aslan Maskhadov and negotiated the prisoner exchange with him, using his level of culture, his political maturity, his language abilities, his Iranian origin as well as his fundamental knowledge of Russia. He carried out detention-protection activities at the Filtration Points. He registered detainees held in connection with the hostilities by the Russian federal authorities in Grozny. The war zone in Chechnya proved to be a particularly dangerous one for Westerners, even over and above the fighting itself. In his book Mission in Chechnya having had some time to consider his material, he tried to offer an intense rendition of what life was like at the time, including the sort of reports coming in over Russian radio: "Interior troops OMON combing Grozny districts pay special attention to local men. By own experience they know that sometimes civilian with white armband proves to be militant. It is simple to establish: if person has corn on his forefinger because of trigger and there are bruises on his shoulders that appear because of recoil in shooting after several days of fighting, person in question is fighter. I switched off my radio set and asked Foggy, 'What time is it?' He answered, 'Eight o'clock.' There was a thick mist, so thick that the front truck was out of sight."

In 1996 he worked for the International Committee of the Red Cross in Afghanistan as an interpreter and translator. During his mission in Afghanistan his line of responsibility was not only to be a translator. He established contact with the Afghan population. In 2002 he was a German Agro Action delegate in Afghanistan.

In 2009 he took part in the European Russian Language Contest and was among the 500 European winners of 35000 participants, invited to Saint Petersburg to take part in the final round of the contest to demonstrate the knowledge and ability to use all the richness and expressiveness of the Russian language. At the grand closing ceremony of the contest the president of the Saint Petersburg State University announced that he has received second place in his category and he was awarded with the honorary document of the chairperson of the European Russian Language Contes  for demonstrating excellence in Russian language.

In 2011 he took part in the International Russian Language Contest in Saint Petersburg and was among the 600 winners of 65000 participants, invited to Saint Petersburg to take part in the final round of the contest and he was awarded with the honorary document of the chairperson of the International Russian Language Contest for demonstrating excellence in Russian language.

On October 25, 2013 with his song ″Peace″ he became one of the winners of the ″Chaika″ Global Internet Competition dedicated to the 50th anniversary of the first woman cosmonaut Valentina Tereshkova space flight.

On January 28, 2016 the Boris Yeltsin Presidential Library of Saint Petersburg, Russia announced the winners of the international photo contest ″Foreigner′s View 2015″. Alexios Schandermani was one of the winners of this contest.

Since October 2018 member of the American Society of Composers, Authors, and Publishers (ASCAP)

Publications
Mission in Chechnya / Nova Science Publishers. New York 2002. 
 One Euro Spy / an extended chapter in the book Afghanistan Issues: Security, Narcotics and Political Currents. Nova Science Publishers. New York City 2007.
One Euro Spy outlines the biography of Hans Mueller, a German citizen, who ran a spy ring in Afghanistan.
Author of verses published by Clemens Brentano Publishers Frankfurt / Main. Germany 2004. 2005. 2007. 2008. 2009. 2010. 2011. 2012. 2013. 
Hello New York / Music album / Sweet Sound Studios. Release Date: October 25, 2013. New York City, USA. ISRC 888174333892
Foreign View. The world saved by beauty. Photo album of the VI international photo contest. The Presidential Library of St. Petersburg, Russia 2015, p. 80. 
Persian Gypsy / Music album / Mercy Sound Studios. Release Date: October 25, 2018. New York City, USA. ISRC 193428111332

References

Adele Frey-Draxler (2007). German author's encyclopedia (Deutsches Schriftstellerlexikon). Association of German Authors BDS (Bund Deutscher Schriftsteller), Dietzenbach, Germany. p. 639. 
Renate Stahl (2010). German author's encyclopedia (Deutsches Schriftstellerlexikon). Association of German Authors BDS (Bund Deutscher Schriftsteller), Dietzenbach, Germany. p. 690-691. 
R.R. Bowker Company (2002).  American Book Publishing Record . Bowker, New York, USA. p. 198.

External links
Mission in Chechnya
Afghanistan Issues: Security, Narcotics and Political Currents
One Euro Spy
Poetry
Hello New York
Persian Gypsy

1953 births
Living people
Iranian writers
People from Tehran
Iranian expatriates in the Soviet Union
Iranian emigrants to Germany
People granted political asylum in the Soviet Union